Lai Chi may refer to:

Lai Chi, the western portion of Quarry Bay on Hong Kong Island
Lai Chi (football), a Macanese football team
Lai Ji (610–662), Lai Chi in Wade–Giles, Tang dynasty minister